Madhusudan Law University formerly MS Law College is the oldest Law Institute and affiliating University of the State of Odisha. The college is situated at Municipal Colony in Cuttack in the Indian state of Odisha. It offers 3 years LL.B.(Hons.), 5 years Integrated B.A., LL.B.(Hons) and 2 years LL.M. course approved from Bar Council of India (BCI).

History
In 1869 the law course was introduced in the Ravenshaw Collegiate School, Cuttack. thereafter it continued in the Ravenshaw College. That time the Bachelor of Law course was under the University of Calcutta and after the foundation of Utkal University in 1943 the Madhusudan Law College was also established in the same year. This college is named after National Leader and politician Madhusudan Das.

From 28 April 2021 all government and private law colleges of Odisha, other than constituent law colleges will be affiliated under Madhusudan Law University.

Notable alumni

 Pradip Kumar Mohanty
 Gobinda Chandra Majhi
 Pratap Jena
 Ainthu Sahoo
 Ananga Kumar Patnaik
 Rabi Ray
 Gopal Ballav Pattanaik
 Gopanarayan Das

References 

Education in Cuttack
Educational institutions established in 1943
1943 establishments in India
Universities and colleges in Odisha
Law schools in Odisha